Svein Flåtten (born 14 October 1944 in Andebu) is a Norwegian politician for the Conservative Party.

He was elected to the Norwegian Parliament from Vestfold in 2001, and has been re-elected on one occasion.
 
Flåtten was a member of the executive committee of Sandefjord municipality council from 1995 to 2001.

References

1944 births
Living people
Conservative Party (Norway) politicians
Members of the Storting
21st-century Norwegian politicians